German submarine U-538 was a Type IXC/40 U-boat of Nazi Germany's Kriegsmarine during World War II.

She was laid down at the Deutsche Werft (yard) in Hamburg as yard number 356 on 18 April 1942, launched on 20 November and commissioned on 10 February 1943 with Kapitänleutnant Johann-Egbert Gosseler in command.

U-538 began her service career with training as part of the 4th U-boat Flotilla from 10 February 1943. She was reassigned to the 2nd flotilla for operations on 1 November.

She carried out one patrol and did not sink any ships. She was a member of one wolfpack.

She was sunk on 21 November 1943, southwest of Ireland by British warships.

Design
German Type IXC/40 submarines were slightly larger than the original Type IXCs. U-538 had a displacement of  when at the surface and  while submerged. She had two shafts and two  propellers.

U-538 was fitted with six  torpedo tubes (four fitted at the bow and two at the stern), 22 torpedoes, one  SK C/32 naval gun, 180 rounds, and a  SK C/30 as well as a  C/30 anti-aircraft gun. The boat had a complement of forty-eight.

Service history

Patrol and loss
The boat departed Kiel on 19 October 1943, moved through the North Sea, negotiated the gap between Iceland and the Faroe Islands and entered the Atlantic Ocean. She was heading for the French Atlantic ports.

She was sunk on 21 November 1943, southwest of Ireland by depth charges dropped from the British frigate  and the sloop .

Fifty-five men died; there were no survivors.

Wolfpacks
U-538 took part in one wolfpack, namely:
 Eisenhart 1 (9 – 15 November 1943)

References

Bibliography

External links

German Type IX submarines
U-boats commissioned in 1943
U-boats sunk in 1943
World War II submarines of Germany
1942 ships
World War II shipwrecks in the Atlantic Ocean
Ships built in Hamburg
U-boats sunk by depth charges
U-boats sunk by British warships
Ships lost with all hands
Maritime incidents in November 1943